The British Columbia General Employees' Union (BCGEU) is a trade union in British Columbia, Canada which represents over 85,000 members. The union employs over 200 servicing and administrative staff in 12 area offices across the province and at the Burnaby head office. The current President of the BCGEU is Stephanie Smith. Smith was elected to this position in 2014. Previous Presidents were Darryl Walker, George Heyman and John T. Shields.

Structure and history

The union, which dates from 1919, is divided into 550 different bargaining units. About a third of the BCGEU membership work in the provincial public (government) service. The rest work in the broader public sector, including community-based social services, healthcare, education and some crown agencies and authorities, and in the private sector, including credit unions, privatized highways maintenance companies and casinos.  On June 11, 2021 the union voted to rename itself from British Columbia Government and Services Employees Union  to British Columbia General Employees' Union 

The BCGEU first gained full bargaining rights under the BC Public Service Labour Relations Act in 1974. Since then the BCGEU has been involved in a number of precedent-setting legal cases, including BCGEU v. British Columbia on picketing rights under the Charter of Rights and Freedoms and the Meiorin case on the test for discrimination.

The union is divided into a component structure based on occupational groupings. Each component has geographically based locals. This is the union's component structure:
 COMPONENT 1 - Corrections and Sheriff Services
 COMPONENT 3 - Community Social Services
 COMPONENT 4 - Health Services
 COMPONENT 5 - Retail, Stores and Warehouse
 COMPONENT 6 - Social, Information and Health
 COMPONENT 7 - Education, Scientific, Technical and Administrative
 COMPONENT 8 - Community Health Services
 COMPONENT 10 - Operational Services
 COMPONENT 12 - Administrative Services
 COMPONENT 17 - General Services
 COMPONENT 20 - Environmental, Technical and Operational

Most members of BCGEU Components 1, 5, 6, 12 and 20 are covered by B.C.'s Public Service Pension Plan. This pension plan currently has equity of over $23 billion. Most members of the other components are covered by the Municipal Pension Plan (MPP), the College Pension Plan (CPP) or the union's own targeted benefit pension plan.

As the nature of public sector employment has changed in recent decades in British Columbia, the number of BCGEU members who work directly for the government has declined while the number of BCGEU members doing work that has been devolved from the provincial government or contracted to the private sector has increased. The BCGEU is now the leading union organizing casino workers in the province, negotiating strong collective agreements.

Political involvement

Although the union's constitution commits the union to not affiliating with any political party, the BCGEU has been a significant and long-term supporter of the BC New Democratic Party, contributing $157,770.64 in the year following the 2009 provincial election.

Staff

BCGEU staff are themselves unionized, being represented by the Union Workers' Union (UWU) and MoveUP, the Movement of Union Professionals. Bargaining between the BCGEU and its servicing staff (then members of -CEP) employees broke down in 2005, resulting in a multi-week strike.

References

External links
 BC General Employees' Union Web Page
BC Government and Service Employees' Union – Web Archive created by the University of Toronto Libraries (note: former name)

Trade unions in British Columbia
Trade unions established in 1919
Burnaby
1919 establishments in British Columbia